The Hôtel du Petit-Bourbon, a former Parisian town house of the royal family of Bourbon, was located on the right bank of the Seine on the rue d'Autriche, between the Louvre to the west and the Church of Saint-Germain l'Auxerrois to the east. It was constructed in the 14th century, not long after the Capetian Kings of France enlarged the fortress of the Louvre in order to use it as a royal residence. The Bourbons took control of France in 1589, at which time they also acquired the Louvre.

The Great Hall, the Grande Salle du Petit-Bourbon, was larger than any room in the Louvre, and served as the first theatre of the troupe of Molière upon their arrival in Paris in 1658; but by 1660 Molière and his actors were evicted, and the Petit-Bourbon was pulled down to make space for the construction of the Louvre Colonnade.

History

When in the fourteenth century the kings of France began to use the Louvre as their primary Paris residence, courtiers needed to be in Paris in order to pay their respects to the King and to receive his favors. They therefore constructed magnificent town houses (hôtels particuliers) in the vicinity of the Louvre, very few of which have survived to the present day.

According to Henri Sauval, from 1303 to 1404 the Bourbons purchased houses of more than 300 persons to assemble the site on which their new hotel was built. Over the years they augmented and embellished it such that it became one of the most magnificent in the kingdom. Sauval describes the great hall and the chapel (which both still existed at the time he was writing), as the largest and most sumptuous of their kind in Paris.

In 1523 Charles III, Duke of Bourbon, who was Constable of France at the time, plotted to partition France against the will of King Francis I. When the plot was uncovered, Charles was forced to flee to Italy, and as a result the Hôtel de Bourbon was partly demolished. "Salt was strewed upon the ground which it occupied; the armorial ensigns of the offender were effaced, and the windows and doors that remained were smeared by the executioner with yellow ochre."

The Grande Salle

The Great Hall (French: Grande Salle) was used for numerous court functions. Catherine de Médicis staged the "politically charged" Paradis d'amour at the Petit-Bourbon on 20 August 1572, at the time of the wedding of the Catholic Marguerite de Valois and the Protestant Henri de Navarre. It was a dramatic ballet with scenery and sung recitatives, and introduced the new genre of ballet de cour.

The Ballet Comique de la Reine, regarded by James R. Anthony as the first true ballet de cour, was performed at the Petit-Bourbon on 15  October 1581, during the festivities surrounding the marriage of the Duke de Joyeuse and the queen's sister, Marguerite de Vaudemont. The French court's first great carousel (a type of tourney performed as a ballet) was held in the Grande Salle in February 1605. The Estates General of 1614 and 1615 and some of the celebrations accompanying the marriage of Louis XIII in 1615 were also held there.

Louis XIII selected the subject for the ballet de cour La délivrance de Renaud, based on the story of Rinaldo in Tasso's popular 1581 epic poem Gerusalemme liberata. It was first performed on 29 January 1617, when the king danced a demon of fire. It was not difficult to draw a parallel between Tancrède and his knights fighting the monsters of the enchanted forest and Louis XIII and his favorite, Charles d'Albert de Luynes, rescuing France from its enemies. According to the livret published by Ballard in 1617, the opening grand concert de musique was performed by "sixty-four voices, twenty-eight viols, and fourteen lutes conducted by le sieur Mauduit."

The dimensions of the hall were ample by Parisian standards: 15 meters wide and 35 meters long with an apse adding an additional 13.5 meters at one end. During the Estates General of 1614, the king and his courtiers sat in the apse, which was decorated with fleur-de-lis. Lawrenson suggests that on some occasions, such as the Ballet Comique de la Reine, a kind of stage was located in the apse. The general public was accommodated in two tiers of balconies on the walls.

La finta pazza, an Italian play by Giulio Strozzi mixed with an opera by Francesco Sacrati was given under the auspices of Cardinal Mazarin in December 1645. The production employed elaborate stage scenery with set changes and special effects accomplished via theatre machines designed by Giacomo Torelli.

In February 1650, during the  Fronde when all things Italian were suspect, Pierre Corneille's French play Andromède was premiered. This was yet another spectacular play designed by Torelli. The incidental music composed by Dassoucy was intended to cover up the noise of the machinery.

Mazarin's triumph over the Frondeurs and return from exile was celebrated with the Ballet de la Nuit, produced on 23 February 1653 with sets and machinery by Torelli. The young Louis XIV appeared as the "Sun brilliant with light" and danced five other roles. The Italian opera Le nozze di Peleo e di Teti by Carlo Caproli was performed on 14 April 1654 with Torelli's scenic machinery again the main attraction, and again Louis XIV danced six roles: Apollo, a Fury, a dryad, an academician, a courtier, and War.

The Petit-Bourbon on old maps of Paris

Notes

Bibliography
 Anthony, James R. (2001). "Ballet de cour" in Sadie 2001. Also at Oxford Music Online (subscription required).
 Bjurström, Per (1962). Giacomo Torelli and Baroque Stage Design, 2nd revised edition, translated from the Swedish. Stockholm: Almqvist & Wiksell. .
 Félibien, Michel (1725). Histoire de la ville de Paris, vol. 4. Paris: Guillaume Desprez; Jean Desessartz. View at Google Books.
 Galignani, A.; Galignani, W., publishers (1825). The History of Paris from the Earliest Period to the Present Day, 3 volumes. Paris: A. and W. Galignani. Vols. 1 (2nd ed., 1832), 2 (1825), and 3 (1825) at Google Books.
 Hare, Augustus J.C. (1888). Walks in Paris. New York: George Routledge and Sons. View at Google Books.
 Howarth, William D., editor (1997). French Theatre in the Neo-classical Era, 1550–1789. Cambridge: Cambridge University Press. .
 Isherwood, Robert M. (1973). Music in the Service of the King. France in the Seventeenth Century. Ithaca: Cornell University Press. .
 Lawrenson, T. E. (1986). The French Stage and Playhouse in the XVIIth Century: A Study in the Advent of the Italian Order, second edition, revised and enlarged. New York: AMS Press. .
 Sadie, Stanley, editor (2001). The New Grove Dictionary of Music and Musicians, 2nd edition. London: Macmillan.  (hardcover). OCLC 419285866 (eBook).
 Sauval, Henri (1724). Histoire et recherches des antiquite's de la ville de Paris, 3 volumes. Paris: Charles Moette; Jacques Chardon. Vols. 1, 2 and 3 (copies 1 and 2) at Google Books.
 Timms, Colin (2001). "Tourney" in Sadie 2001. Also at Oxford Music Online (subscription required).

Former buildings and structures in Paris
Petit-Bourbon
Buildings and structures in the 1st arrondissement of Paris
Buildings and structures demolished in the 17th century
Demolished buildings and structures in Paris